The Prix Jules Janssen is the highest award of the Société astronomique de France (SAF), the French astronomical society.

This annual prize is given to a professional French astronomer or to an astronomer of another nationality in recognition of astronomical work in general, or for services rendered to Astronomy. The first recipient of the prize was Camille Flammarion, the founder of the Société astronomique de France, in 1897. The prize has been continuously awarded since then with the exception of the two World Wars. Non-French recipients have come from various countries including the United States, the United Kingdom, Canada, Switzerland, the Netherlands, Germany, Belgium, Sweden, Italy, Spain, Hungary, India, the former Czechoslovakia, and the former Soviet Union.

It was established by the French astronomer Pierre Jules César Janssen (known as Jules Janssen) during his tenure as president of SAF from 1895 to 1897. Janssen announced the creation of the new prize at a meeting of the Société Astronomique de France on 2 December 1896.

The medal was designed in 1896 by the Parisian engraver Alphée Dubois (1831–1905). It is minted by the Monnaie de Paris.

This prize is distinct from the Janssen Medal (created in 1886), which is awarded by the French Academy of Sciences and also named for Janssen.

Laureates

See also 
 List of astronomy awards
 Prizes named after people

References

External links 
 Official list of all recipients of the prix Jules–Janssen given by the French Astronomical Society

Astronomy prizes
French awards
Awards established in 1897
1897 establishments in France